Misr Insurance, sometimes translated as Egypt Insurance, is an Egyptian basketball club based in Alexandria. The team plays in the Egyptian Basketball Super League, the highest level league in the country.

The team is owned by and named after the insurance company Misr Life Insurance.

Notable players

 Mostafa Meshaal

References

Basketball teams in Egypt
Sport in Alexandria